Mahalibeh castle, formerly known as Balatanos or Balatunus (name derived from the Latin Platanus), is located on a high mountain summit near Lattakia, 40 km inland of the Syrian coast.

History 
The castle was built in the 11th century by the Bani Alahmar tribe.  In 1031, it was occupied by Niketas of Mistheia of the Byzantine empire.  In 1118, it was occupied by Crusaders, led by Roger of Salerno.  The castle suffered many fights and damages, and finally surrendered to Saladdin in 1188, namely to his son Alzaher Alghazi in 1194.  In 1269, it was restored by Baibars.  In 1280, it was under the control of Sunqur al-Ashqar, before being retaken by Qalawun in 1285.  In 1408, a strong earthquake considerably damaged the castle, and it was abandoned.

The castle is damaged totally but it is being restored now.  The outer walls surround the bulk massive of the castle.  There are cisterns, underground rooms, and remnants of premises in the middle, plus some arches and towers are visible. The only attaching section to the surrounding land is through a southern piece of connecting lane, where the road goes.

The castle is reached through paved road via Qardaha from the west and Jawbat Burghal from the east.

References

Bibliography 
 

Castles in Syria
Buildings and structures in Latakia Governorate
Archaeological sites in Latakia Governorate